This is a list of fighter aces from Greece.

World War I
Greece provided only one flying ace in World War I:

World War II
Greece had six flying aces in World War II.

See also
List of World War I flying aces
List of World War II aces by country

Notes and references

External links
The Greek PZL fighters 
Greeks in Spitfires
Plagis Yiannis 

Greece
World War II Aces
 
 
 
Greece
Flying aces from Greece